Exorcisms and Ecstasies is a collection of fantasy and horror short stories by author Karl Edward Wagner. The collection also includes a number of memoirs and articles about Wagner and is edited by Stephen Jones.  It was released in 1997 by Fedogan & Bremer in an edition of 2,100 copies, of which 100 included Wagner's signature taken from a canceled check or contract.  The limited edition was also signed by the artist, editor and other contributors to the collection.  Many of the stories originally appeared in a number of different anthologies and collections or in the magazines Beyond Fantasy & Science Fiction, Kadath, Weird Tales, The Centralite, Midnight Sun, Fantasy Crossroads and Gauntlet.

Contents
 "Introduction: Talking with Karl", by Stephen Jones
 "Midnight Sun"
 Exorcisms and Ecstasies
 "Various Encounters with Karl" by Peter Straub
 "Did They Get You to Trade?"
 "The Kind Men Like"
 "Cedar Lane"
 "The Slug"
 "Final Cut"
 "Locked Away"
 "Endless Night"
 "A Walk on the Wild Side"
 "Passages"
 "Little Lessons in Gardening"
 "I’ve Come to Talk with You Again"
 "An Awareness of Angels"
 "But You’ll Never Follow Me"
 "Plan 10 from Inner Space"
 "Prince of the Punks"
 "The Picture of Jonathan Collins"
 "Gremlin"
 "Brushed Away"
 "In the Middle of a Snow Dream"
 "The Big Dutchman", by Frances Wellman
 Silver Dagger: Kane"
 "All Good Friends, by David J. Schow
 "In the Wake of the Night"
 "The Treasure of Lynortis"
 "The Gothic Touch"
 "At First Just Ghostly"
 "Deep in the Depths of the Acme Warehouse"
 "Friends Die", by Ramsey Campbell
 Satan’s Gun: Adrian Becker
 "Doc Wagner", by Jenny Campbell
 "Satan’s Gun"
 "Hell Creek"
 "One Paris Night"
 "The Truth Insofar as I Know It, by David Drake
 Tell Me, Dark: Uncollected Stories
 "Brother Karl: Stories First and Last, by James R. Wagner
 "The Education of Gergy-doo-doo"
 "Stardust"
 "Killer"
 "The Coming of Ghor"
 "A Fair Cop"
 "Karl Edward Wagner: Sassenach", by Brian Lumley
 "Karl Edward Wagner: A Working Bibliography of English Language First Editions", by Scott F. Wyatt & Stephen Jones
 "Afterword: Karl Edward Wagner—A Personal Farewell", by C. Bruce Hunter
 "Death Angel’s Shadow"

References

1997 short story collections
Horror short story collections
Fantasy short story collections
Karl Edward Wagner
Fedogan & Bremer books